Felipe Rodrigues dos Santos (born 31 October 1995), known as Felipe Diadema or Felipe Rodrigues, is a Brazilian footballer who plays for Vorskla Poltava. Mainly a right back, he can also play as a central defender or defensive midfielder.

Club career
Born in São Paulo, Felipe finished his formation with Paulista, although first appearing as a senior for Clube Atlético Diadema in the 2013 season. He made his first team debut for the former on 5 March 2014, coming on as a half-time substitute in a 2–1 Campeonato Paulista away loss against Oeste; thirteen days later he scored his first senior goal, netting the first in a 4–4 draw at Mogi Mirim.

On 10 December 2015, Felipe signed for Audax. Mainly a backup, he appeared in eight matches during the 2016 Campeonato Paulista, scoring a bicycle kick goal against Água Santa on 21 February.

Felipe represented Oeste on loan in the 2016 Série B, after a partnership with Audax was established. On 25 May 2017, he was loaned to Santos for one year, being initially assigned to the B-team.

On 8 January 2018, Felipe was loaned to fellow top tier club Sport for one year.

On 3 July 2018,Felipe joined Série B side Guarani on loan until the end of the season.

Career statistics

References

External links

1995 births
Living people
Footballers from São Paulo
Brazilian footballers
Brazilian expatriate footballers
Association football defenders
Association football midfielders
Association football utility players
Campeonato Brasileiro Série B players
Campeonato Brasileiro Série D players
Paulista Futebol Clube players
Grêmio Osasco Audax Esporte Clube players
Oeste Futebol Clube players
Santos FC players
Sport Club do Recife players
Guarani FC players
Vila Nova Futebol Clube players
Grêmio Novorizontino players
FC Vorskla Poltava players
Expatriate footballers in Ukraine
Brazilian expatriate sportspeople in Ukraine